Niobium(IV) chloride, also known as niobium tetrachloride, is the chemical compound of formula NbCl4.  This compound exists as dark violet crystals, is highly sensitive to air and moisture, and disproportiates into niobium(III) chloride and niobium(V) chloride when heated.

Structure and properties
In the solid state, niobium(IV) chloride exists as chains of edge-sharing octahedra with alternating Nb-Nb distances of lengths 302.9 and 379.4 pm.  The shorter distances correspond to Nb-Nb bonds, which result in the compound's diamagnetism.  Its structure is very similar to that of tungsten(IV) chloride.

Other coordination complexes with the formula NbCl4L2, such as tetrachlorobis(tetrahydrofuran) niobium, only form monomers resulting in one unpaired electron in the dxy orbital, making the compounds paramagnetic.

Niobium chloride rapidly oxidizes and hydrolyzes in air to form niobium(V) oxide.

Preparation
Niobium(IV) chloride is typically produced by allowing elemental niobium and niobium(V) chloride crystals to react over several days in a temperature gradient, with the metal around 400 °C and the salt around 250 °C.
4 NbCl5 + Nb → 5 NbCl4

Niobium (IV) chloride can also prepared by a similar reduction of niobium pentachloride with powdered aluminium.
3 NbCl5 + Al → 3 NbCl4 + AlCl3

A similar technique is also used in the synthesis of niobium(IV) bromide and tantalum(IV) chloride.  Niobium(IV) iodide exists as well and may be synthesized by thermal decomposition of niobium(V) iodide.

At 400 °C NbCl4 disproportiates:
2 NbCl4 → NbCl3 + NbCl5

Reactions
The disproportiation of niobium(IV) chloride can be used to make tetrachlorobis(tetrahydrofuran) niobium, a useful synthon in NbIV chemistry due to the lability of the attached tetrahydrofuran ligands. This compound can be synthesized by first reacting NbCl5 with aluminium in acetonitrile followed by addition of tetrahydrofuran to the resultant solid by the following reaction.

 3 NbCl5 + Al + 3 CH3CN → 3 NbCl4(NCCH3)3 + AlCl3
 3 NbCl4(NCCH3)3 + AlCl3 + 3 C4H8O → 3 NbCl4(thf)2 + 9 MeCN + AlCl3(thf)

References

Niobium(IV) compounds
Chlorides
Metal halides